Liolaemus forsteri, Forster's tree iguana, is a species of lizard in the family Liolaemidae. It is native to Bolivia.

References

forsteri
Reptiles described in 1982
Reptiles of Bolivia
Taxa named by Raymond Laurent